Crimen a las tres is a 1935  Argentine crime film directed and written by Luis Saslavsky.

Main cast
Blanca de Castejón
Eduardo Berri
Malena Bravo
Héctor Cataruzza
Augusto Codecá
Ana May

External links

1935 films
1930s Spanish-language films
Argentine black-and-white films
1935 crime films
Films directed by Luis Saslavsky
Argentine crime films
1930s Argentine films